Charleston International Airport  is a joint civil-military airport located in North Charleston, South Carolina, United States. The airport is operated by the Charleston County Aviation Authority under a joint-use agreement with Joint Base Charleston. It is South Carolina's busiest airport; in 2022 the airport served over 5.3 million passengers in its busiest year on record. The airport serves as a focus city for Breeze Airways. It is also home to the Boeing facility that assembles the 787 Dreamliner.

History
In 1928, the Charleston Airport Corporation was founded and purchased  of land previously belonging to a mining company. Although privately developed at first, the City of Charleston floated bonds in 1931 to acquire a portion of the site for passenger service. Within ten years, three runways were paved and outfitted with lighting for nighttime operations. In World War II, control of the airfield passed to the United States Army though civilian service was allowed to continue to use the airfield. After the war, the airfield reverted to civilian use for a short time. In 1949, a new passenger terminal was built.

During the Korean War, the airfield was reactivated for military use and in 1952, the City of Charleston and the United States Air Force reached an agreement on control of the base and the runways—an arrangement that has been renegotiated over time and that continues to this day. In 1979, the civilian portions of the airport were transferred from the City of Charleston to the Charleston County Aviation Authority, which had operated two other airports in the area. The current terminal on the south end of the airport was built in the 1980s on land acquired by Georgia Pacific.

The facility began limited operations in July 2011 and rolled out its first completed aircraft in April 2012. Additional facilities to complement aircraft assembly have since been announced by the company.

Throughout its history, all three domestic legacy carriers (American Airlines, Delta Air Lines, and United Airlines) and their predecessor companies or affiliates have served Charleston International Airport. 

Aside from the legacy carriers, Charleston has seen periods of additional air service from other carriers, but prior to 2010, those services were short-lived. The airport has had brief periods of international service. In 2001, Air Canada briefly served the airport from Toronto but ended service immediately after the September 11th attacks. Porter Airlines briefly served Charleston with flights to Toronto in 2015. In April 2019, British Airways launched a direct route from London Heathrow for the summer season. This became the first scheduled transatlantic flight to operate from Charleston. This also made Charleston the smallest U.S. city that British Airways serviced, and the only U.S. city that they serviced seasonally. This route was canceled in December 2020.

Since 2010, the airport's passenger figures have doubled. New services established by additional airlines during this time along with increased services from the three legacy carriers have contributed to this growth. As of 2019, the airport is the only facility in South Carolina to offer regular flights to destinations in all four time zones in the contiguous United States.

In 2021, the newly established Breeze Airways announced that the airport would serve as a focus city for the airline and announced service to 11 cities. Additional destinations have been added by Breeze since then, including transcontinental flights to Los Angeles, San Francisco, and Las Vegas.

In 2022, the airport authority announced a 20 year master plan for future growth of the airport, including the constructing of an additional concourse, adding up to 11 new gates, providing additional plane stands, and expanding parking facilities for vehicles.

Facilities

The airport consists of four general areas: the military area to the west, the airline terminal to the south, the general aviation area to the east, and the Boeing assembly area further to the south.

For the 12-month period ending May 31, 2019, the airport had 118,211 aircraft operations, an average of 324 per day: 42% commercial, 28% general aviation, 16% military, and 13% air taxi. In May 2019, there were 81 aircraft based at this airport: 28 single-engine, 6 multi-engine, 43 jet, and 4 helicopter.

Joint Base Charleston owns and operates the runways at the airport and has an agreement with the Charleston County Aviation Authority to allow civilian use of the field. General aviation services are operated by the Charleston County Aviation Authority. Boeing South Carolina operates the Boeing assembly area.

Terminal

The current airline terminal completed a three-year, $200 million redevelopment project in 2016 which added five gates and significantly renovated the interior appearance of the facility. The original terminal was built in 1985 and was designed by Howard Needles Tammen & Bergendoff, Davis & Floyd, Inc., and Lucas & Stubbs.

Both departures and arrivals are located on the same floor, with the departure area to the east end of the terminal and the arrival area to the west end. Flights depart from two concourses: Concourse A towards the east and Concourse B towards the west. Since 2015, a consolidated TSA security checkpoint is utilized for both concourses. Charleston International Airport is classified as a security-level Category I airport by the TSA. The airport is equipped to handle international flights.

Concourse A contains eight gates (A1, A2, A2A, and A3-A7) that are primarily used by Delta Air Lines and Delta Connection, with other airlines occasionally using gates as needed for overflow. Concourse B contains ten gates (B1-B10) and is used by other airlines serving the airport. Concourse B also contains the international arrivals facility.

Ground transportation
Charleston International Airport is located near the interchange of Interstate 26 and Interstate 526 and is accessible from both interstates using International Boulevard and Montague Avenue exits. The airport  offers a free cell phone parking lot for passenger pickups. For short-term and long-term parking, the airport offers surface or garage parking for up to 30 days. Rental cars from major companies are available. The airport completed a rental car pavilion adjacent to the terminal in 2014.

CARTA, the regional mass transit system, serves the airport with one bus route that operates seven days a week.
CARTA Route 11 is a local service that connects the airport to downtown Charleston with several stops along Dorchester Road and Meeting Street in North Charleston. Total trip time from the airport to downtown is usually 50–55 minutes.

Airlines and destinations

Passenger

Cargo

Statistics

Airline market share

Top destinations

Annual traffic

Accidents and incidents
 December 31, 1946: A Douglas C-47 operated by Inter Continental Air Transport crashed after a missed first approach. He attempted to remain visual while flying below a  ragged ceiling. Flying over dark, heavily wooded terrain, the left wing struck treetops, lost control and crashed  NW of Charleston. All five occupants (three crew, two passengers) perished.
 March 14, 1947: a Douglas DC-3 operated by US Airlines approached Charleston low and left of the runway, struck trees  from the runway, crashed and burned. Both occupants were killed.
 August 23, 1955: A USAF Kaiser-Frazer Fairchild C-119 Flying Boxcar impacted a tree and crashed after a takeoff for a night flight in a residential area,  SE of Charleston AFB. A fire erupted, destroying several homes. Reports said one engine was on fire when the crash occurred. Five of the 11 occupants on the aircraft were killed and four on the ground died.
 October 3, 1956: A USAF Douglas C-124 Globemaster II crashed on approach  NW of Charleston AFB when the pilot descended below minumums, struck trees and crashed. Three of the 10 on board were killed. 
 September 18, 1979: A USAF Lockheed C-141 Starlifter caught fire after touchdown at CHS when the landing gear retracted along with several other mechanical issues occurring at once. The aircraft was destroyed, but there were no fatalities.
November 2, 2020: Joel T. Drogomir was arrested on a charge "conveying false information regarding attempted use of a destructive device" after he falsely threatened to have a bomb.

References

External links

South Carolina Aeronautics Commission, official site
Charleston International Airport, official site
Charleston Air Force Base, official site
Anna. aero article, Analysis of airport traffic and serving airlines

Airports in South Carolina
Transportation in Charleston, South Carolina
Transportation in North Charleston, South Carolina
Buildings and structures in North Charleston, South Carolina